The 2019-20 North Dakota Fighting Hawks men's ice hockey season was the 78th season of play for the program and the 7th in the NCHC conference. The Fighting Hawks represented the University of North Dakota and were coached by Brad Berry, in his 5th season. The team won the Penrose Cup, the NCHC regular season championship, for the 3rd time. No postseason was played due to the outbreak of COVID-19.

Roster
As of September 8, 2019.

Standings

Schedule and Results

|-
!colspan=12 style=";" | Exhibition

|-
!colspan=12 style=";" | Regular Season

|-
!colspan=12 style=";" | 
|- align="center" bgcolor="#e0e0e0"
|colspan=12|Tournament Cancelled

Scoring Statistics

Goaltending statistics

Rankings

Players drafted into the NHL

2020 NHL Entry Draft

† incoming freshman‡ Mitchell was subsequently removed from the program after information about his bullying of a handicapped minority classmate became public.

References

North Dakota Fighting Hawks men's ice hockey seasons
North Dakota Fighting Hawks
North Dakota Fighting Hawks
North Dakota Fighting Hawks
North Dakota Fighting Hawks